Bad Wünnenberg is a town in the district of Paderborn, in North Rhine-Westphalia, Germany. It is situated on the river Aabach, approximately 20 km south of Paderborn.

References

Paderborn (district)
Spa towns in Germany